Chimera (also known as Deputat Baltiki) was a Russian underground rock band formed by singer/guitarist  and lead-guitarist Gennady Bachinsky in St. Petersburg in 1990. It was the main group of the club Tamtam, in which Korol i Shut and Tequilajazzz also performed. Chimera repeatedly gave concerts in Germany.

In February 1997, at the age of 27, Starkov hanged himself in the attic of Chimera's rehearsal space. The group disbanded after Starkov's death.

Legacy
Chimera's songs have been covered by artists and bands such as Psychea, Pilot, Iva Nova, Zakhar May, and PTVP.  of PTVP said: "Chimera is the best thing about Russian rock 'n' roll. I am completely sure: throughout the 1990s in music, only two new words were spoken: in the States there was Nirvana, and in Russia — Chimera".

Chimera's influences include Bauhaus, Nico, Butthole Surfers, Sonic Youth, Fugazi, Daniil Kharms, Jules Verne, Helena Blavatsky, and Philip K. Dick.

Discography 
1991 Redt Starkov & Co
1991 Half-Petrograd Acoustics (Полупетроградская акустика)
1991 Nautiluses (Кораблики)
1991 Stoker Dreams (Сны кочегара)
1991 Commissioner of Smoke Gendarmerie (Комиссар дымовой жандармерии)
1992 Visionaries (Фантазёры)
1993 Chimera (Химера)
1994 Electric Train (Электричка)
1994 Kalevala (Калевала)
1995 Nuihuli
1997 It's Me (Это я)
1997 ZUDWA

Members 
  ("Redt") - lead singer, acoustic guitar, electric guitar, accordion, wind instrument
 Gennady Bachinsky - guitar, producer
 Urij Lebedev - bass guitar
 Vladislav Viktorov ("Vitus") - drums
 Paul Labutin - cello

References

Bibliography
Аксютина О. Панк-вирус в России. Леан, 1999. — 320 с. — 
Бурлака А. Рок-энциклопедия. Популярная музыка в Ленинграде-Петербурге. 1965—2005. Том 3. — М.: Амфора, 2007. — С. 433—477.
Никонов А. Нулевые. С-Пб.: Карма Мира/ШSS, 2009. — 186 с.

External links
Химера Discography

Musical groups from Saint Petersburg
1990s in music
Musical groups established in 1990
Musical groups disestablished in 1997
Experimental musical groups
Russian indie rock groups
Russian gothic rock groups
Russian psychedelic rock music groups
Noise rock groups
Russian alternative rock groups
Soviet rock music groups